This is a list of members of the second Parliament of Lebanon, serving from 1929 to 1932.

List of members

References 

Lists of members of the Parliament of Lebanon by term